İncirli is a village in the District of Haymana, Ankara Province, Turkey.

Population 
As of 2017 there are 81 inhabitants in the village of İncirli, down from 178 inhabitants in 1985.

The village is populated by the Kurdish Şêxbizin tribe.

References

Villages in Haymana District

Kurdish settlements in Ankara Province